Straneoites is a genus of ground beetles in the family Carabidae. This genus has a single species, Straneoites morogoro. It is found in Tanzania.

References

Trechinae
Monotypic Carabidae genera